Pykhtino is a planned Moscow Metro station of the Kalininsko-Solntsevskaya line. It will be opened in 2023.

References

Moscow Metro stations
Kalininsko-Solntsevskaya line
Railway stations located underground in Russia
Railway stations under construction in Russia